Raqefet Cave (Cyclamen Cave) is a Late Natufian archaeological site located in Mount Carmel in the north of Israel. It was discovered in 1956. The site indicates plants were already used as food at Raqefet, before the advent of agriculture.

History
Remains in one of the chambers of the cave suggest the production of beer during the occupation of the cave. The earliest archaeological evidence of fermentation consists of 13,000-year-old residues of a beer with the consistency of gruel, used by the semi-nomadic Natufians for ritual feasting, at the Raqefet Cave.

Earlier levels at Raqefet include remains from the Levantine Aurignacian. Earlier Mousterian remains were also found at Site 187.

In 2020, incised slabs were discovered at Raqefet Cave, with a human figure most likely shown as dancing.

Gallery

See also
 History of beer

References

Bibliography 
 
 
 
 

Prehistoric sites in Israel
Natufian sites
1956 archaeological discoveries
Landforms of Northern District (Israel)
Caves of Israel
Mount Carmel
Levantine Aurignacian
Mousterian
11th millennium BC